Saša Mus (born 19 July 1986) is a Croatian former professional footballer who last played for Hong Kong First Division League club Happy Valley as a defender.

Club career
Born in Slavonski Brod, Mus started his playing career with Marsonia in the Druga HNL. Over the next years, he emerged as an important part of the squad. In 2007, he was transferred to another Druga HNL club Croatia Sesvete. With the club, Mus won promotion to Prva HNL the same year.

He then tasted foreign environment after joining SC Weiz of  Austrian Regional League Central. He was not frequent in the Austrian club and so signed for GOŠK Gabela in the same year. After making 14 appearances for the club, he tried his luck with Beijing Baxy but he did not make a single appearance.

In 2012, he again returned to his country, this time with Oriolik in Treća HNL (third tier of Croatian football). He had a brief spell with Bosnian club Zvijezda Gradačac before again returning to Asia with Happy Valley of Hong Kong.

He was jailed for 12 months for match-fixing in 2014 and suspended for life by Hong Kong Football Association in 2015.

References

External links
 

1986 births
Living people
People from Slavonski Brod
Association football defenders
Croatian footballers
NK Marsonia players
NK Croatia Sesvete players
SC Weiz players
NK GOŠK Gabela players
Beijing Sport University F.C. players
NK Zvijezda Gradačac players
Happy Valley AA players
Croatian Football League players
Austrian Regionalliga players
Premier League of Bosnia and Herzegovina players
China League One players
First Football League (Croatia) players
Second Football League (Croatia) players
Hong Kong First Division League players
Croatian expatriate footballers
Expatriate footballers in Austria
Croatian expatriate sportspeople in Austria
Expatriate footballers in Bosnia and Herzegovina
Croatian expatriate sportspeople in Bosnia and Herzegovina
Expatriate footballers in China
Croatian expatriate sportspeople in China
Expatriate footballers in Hong Kong
Croatian expatriate sportspeople in Hong Kong
Match fixers